Mu Aquarii, Latinized from μ Aquarii, is the Bayer designation for a binary star system in the equatorial constellation of Aquarius. It is visible to the naked eye with a combined apparent visual magnitude of 4.7. It is drifting closer to the Sun with a radial velocity of −9.1 km/s.

This star was tentatively identified as a single-lined spectroscopic binary by Helmut A. Abt in 1961. The visible spectrum matches a stellar classification of A3m, with the 'm' suffix indicating that this is an Am, or chemically peculiar star. The primary has an estimated 3.5 times the Sun's radius and is radiating 26 times the luminosity of the Sun from its photosphere at an effective temperature of 6,906 km/s.

This star together with ν Aquarii is Albulaan , derived from an Arabic term al-bulaʽān (ألبولعان) meaning "the two swallowers". This star, along with ε Aqr (Albali) and  ν Aqr (Albulaan), were al Bulaʽ (البلع), the Swallower.

References

External links
 Image Mu Aquarii

Am stars
Spectroscopic binaries

Aquarius (constellation)
Aquarii, Mu
BD-09 5598
Aquarii, 006
198743
103045
7990
Albulaan